Jungle World is a left-wing German weekly newspaper published in Berlin. Initially founded in 1997 by striking editors of the German left-wing daily Junge Welt, it became independent after only a few issues. Today, it is published by the Jungle World Verlags GmbH in the names of over thirty current and former authors, editors, and staff as well as friends of the newspaper.

Jungle World is known for its anti-nationalist and cosmopolitan positions reflect those of the "undogmatic left" in Germany. The articles are published in the weekly's online edition in the days after publication. According to the German Federal Ministry of Family Affairs, the newspaper regularly picks up questions of the Far Left Anti-German spectrum, and contains references to Far Left activities. The newspaper has regular writers who are Anti-Germans. The State Office for the Protection of the Constitution of Brandenburg categorized the newspaper as one of the most important publications of the Anti-German milieu.

The newspaper received a large amount of criticism among the Left in Germany due to its opaque stance on the upcoming Iraq War in 2002 and its criticism of then-Chancellor Gerhard Schröder's use of anti-war politics in his re-election campaign of the same year. A strong point of contention among the German Left is its pro-Israel position. A founder and co-editor of the Jungle World refers to the paper as "explicitly anti-anti-Zionist, anti-anti-Semitic, and anti-anti-American." Anti-imperialists are often accused to be nationalistic by the newspaper.

Since its re-launch on its tenth anniversary in 2007, Jungle World features two sections: the outer concerns mostly political news and analysis on German and international matters as well as debate, the inner section provides cultural and literary criticism, biting satire, and a longer piece in the form of a dossier. Since April 2008 its website has also run a series of blogs.

References

External links
  

1997 establishments in Germany
Anti-Germans (political current)
German-language newspapers
Newspapers published in Berlin
Newspapers established in 1997
Weekly newspapers published in Germany